Halma plc is a British global group of safety equipment companies that makes products for hazard detection and life protection based in Amersham, England. It is listed on the London Stock Exchange and is a constituent of the FTSE 100 Index.

History
The company was established in 1894 in Ceylon as The Nahalma Tea Estate Company Limited. It switched to rubber production in 1937 and became The Nahalma Rubber Estate Company Limited. During the early 1950s the company's rubber estates were nationalised by the Sri Lankan government, and in 1956 the company became Halma Investments Limited, thereby severing its connections with both tea and rubber and becoming an investment and industrial holding company.

In the early 1970s the company began a sequence of acquisitions in the mechanical, electrical and electronic engineering sectors. The company was renamed Halma Limited in 1973 and registered as a public limited company in 1981, becoming Halma plc. In 1984, the company acquired Apollo Fire Detectors, the largest manufacturer of smoke detectors in the UK.

The company undertook three acquisitions in the second half of 2019, including Ampac, another fire detection business, and two further acquisitions in the medical sector in early 2020.

Operations
The company is organised as follows:
 Safety Sector
 Health care Sector
 Environmental & Analysis Sector

References

External links
 Official Halma website

Companies based in Buckinghamshire
Technology companies of the United Kingdom
Fire detection and alarm companies
Conglomerate companies established in 1894
Companies listed on the London Stock Exchange
Technology companies established in 1894
1894 establishments in Ceylon
Amersham